Abdulla, other form of name Abd Allah
 Arkin Abdulla,  Uyhghur musician
 Abdul Samad Abdulla, Maldivian politician and the Minister of Foreign Affairs
 Shakhawan Abdulla, Iraqi politician
Surnames of Maldivian origin